Parasclerocheilus is a genus of worms in the family, Scalibregmatidae, first described by Pierre Fauvel in 1928.

They are segmented marine worms, living on the sea bottom in mud at depths of about 400 m.

There are three species in the genus:

 Parasclerocheilus branchiatus Fauvel, 1928
 Parasclerocheilus capensis Day, 1961
 Parasclerocheilus parva

References

Polychaetes
Taxa named by Pierre Fauvel
Taxa described in 1928